White Post Township is one of twelve townships in Pulaski County, Indiana, United States. As of the 2010 census, its population was 1,075 and it contained 474 housing units. The township is an almost precise 6 mile by 6 mile square; 36.46 square miles and runs from the intersection of County Road 200N and County Road CR1700W (Jasper County line) southwards along CR1700W to CR400S thence east to CR 1100W thence north to CR200N and finally back west to the origin.

White Post Township took its name from a stagecoach stop named White Post, and it is supposed the stop was named for a nearby large white stump.

Geography

Cities, towns, villages
 Medaryville

Adjacent townships
 Cass Township (north)
 Rich Grove Township (northeast)
 Jefferson Township (east)
 Beaver Township (southeast)
 Salem Township (south)
 Gillam Township, Jasper County (west)

Cemeteries
The township contains five cemeteries: White Post, Medaryville (or Rose Hill), Bowman, Saint Henry's and Saint Mark's.

Major highways
  U.S. Route 421
  Indiana State Road 14
  Indiana State Road 114

Education
 West Central School Corporation

White Post Township residents may obtain a free library card from the Pulaski County Public Library in Winamac.

Political districts
 Indiana's 2nd congressional district
 State House District 20
 State Senate District 18

References
 United States Census Bureau 2008 TIGER/Line Shapefiles
 United States Board on Geographic Names (GNIS)
 IndianaMap

External links
 Indiana Township Association
 United Township Association of Indiana

Townships in Pulaski County, Indiana
Townships in Indiana